Strowger may refer to: 

 Strowger switch, automatic telephone exchange equipment
 Strowger Automatic Telephone Exchange Company, the company that manufactured Strowger switches
 Almon Brown Strowger (1839–1902), who invented the principle of the Strowger switch in 1888

See also
 Stroger (disambiguation)